Bruce Foster is an American paper engineer and graphic designer who specializes in pop-up books. Called a "paper magic master", he has created more than 40 pop-up books for both children and adults, in addition to the pop-up designs that appeared in the 2007 film Enchanted.

Biography
Foster studied fine and studio arts the University of Tennessee. He spent years in designing trade show graphics and, later, as an ad agency creative director.

Foster was inspired to learn how to create 3D books after seeing his first pop-up book, Kees Moerbeek's Hot Pursuit: A Forward and Backward Pop-up Book and taught himself by reverse engineering published books. "I destroyed a lot of them trying to figure out how they were done," he said.

He began a career designing pop-up books as a freelancer for Baltimore book children’s book packager Ottenheimer Publishers.

Selected bibliography
The following is a sample of the pop-up books paper engineered by Bruce Foster:

Exhibitions

References

External links

 Official Bruce Foster Website 
 Best of Pop-ups author profile, Bruce Foster
 Smithsonian Libraries interview with book artist Chuck Fischer and paper engineer Bruce Foster on how the pop-up book Angels was created.

Living people
Pop-up book artists
University of Tennessee alumni
Year of birth missing (living people)